Goliath is a 2019 Canadian drama film written, directed, and produced by Luke Villemaire. It stars Jessica Sipos, Michelle Mylett, Jon Cor, and Shannon Kook. Sipos plays Robin Walker, who has to confront her harsh family when she returns home for the funeral of her father. 

Villemaire conceived the film while he was a student at Ryerson University. More than $50,000 was raised through crowdfunding for the film. Filming took place in Quinte West, Ontario, in 2016. Goliath premiered at the Forest City Film Festival in October 2019 and was released on video on demand in February 2023.

Cast

Reception 

Bradley Gibson of Film Threat gave the film a 7 out of 10, writing, "Villemaire’s film would feel like a retread of the familiar prodigal child trope that pops up more often than it should if not for the strength of the performances. Sipos inhabits Robin artfully. In fact, all the roles are played with raw authenticity. Also, the cinematography and music production values are high, and the lighting stands out. There are many beautiful shots of the landscape and the water."

References

External links 

2019 films
Canadian drama films